This is a list of political magazines.

Currently published

No longer published

 The American Mercury, Conservative
 The American Catholic Quarterly Review, Conservative, (1876–1924)
 Arayış, Social Democratic, (1981–1982)
 Dissent (2000–2014)
 Al Fajr Al Jadid, Leftist (1945–1946)
 Forth (2009–2018)
 Fortnight Magazine (1970–2012)
 George (1995–2001)
 Insight, Conservative
 Ken Magazine, Communist 
 Khamsin, anti-Zionist, socialist (1975–1989)
 National Guardian, Communist/Maoist, (1948–1992)
 Det nye Danmark, Conservative, (1928–1937)
 Partisan Review (1934–2003)
 Profane Existence (1989–2013)
 Rinascita, Communist (1944–1991)
 Sawt al-Bahrain (1950–1954)
 Società, Communist (1941–1961)
 Statsborgeren, (1831–1837)
 Viikkosanomat, Conservative (1922–1975)
 The Weekly Standard, Neoconservative, (1995–2018)
 The World of Tomorrow, Socialist (Pacifist)
 The Yankee'' (1828–1829)

Notes

References

Political magazines
Political magazines